The Georgia Renaissance Festival is a Renaissance fair that recreates England's renaissance for entertainment purposes. The time period for the festival is set as the 16th century, during the reign of King Henry VIII. The festival is located near Fairburn, Georgia, United States and has been in operation since 1986.

The festival was canceled for the 2020 season because of COVID-19. From 2021 & hereafter, social distancing and wearing masks are required.

Entertainment 
Ten performance stages are situated throughout the festival, featuring shows for all ages. The entertainment includes jugglers, musicians, comedic storytelling, and the joust. Professional cast members portray the royal court, monks, and peasants. Patrons are encouraged to dress up as well.

The festival features more than 150 artisans, including wire bending, hair wraps and braiding, glassblowing, handmade pottery, and a coin mint. Most of the artisans offer a demonstration of their trade. There are also various clothiers which specialize in period costumes, weapon smiths, and a foundry that offers pewter items. Food vendors at the festival range from a simple lunch, such as turkey legs and ale, to dining at the tea room.

For children there are games of darts, arts and crafts, and rides like the Columbus ships or the Barrel of Bedlam. Children can also enjoy a petting zoo or the birds of prey show.

Awards
The Georgia Renaissance Festival was voted as one of the top 20 Events in the Southeast from the Southeast Tourism Society in 2016.

In 1999 the American Bus Association voted the Georgia Renaissance Festival one of the top 100 events in North America.

See also
 List of Renaissance fairs

References

External links
 http://www.ntunega.com/Georgia-Renaissance-Festival.html 
 Official site

Festivals in Atlanta
Tourist attractions in Fulton County, Georgia
Renaissance fairs
Festivals established in 1986